Miconia hylophila is a species of plant in the family Melastomataceae. It is endemic to Ecuador. Its natural habitat is subtropical or tropical moist lowland forests.

References

hylophila
Endemic flora of Ecuador
Vulnerable plants
Taxonomy articles created by Polbot